Murphy Corner is an unincorporated community in the town of Freedom, Outagamie County, Wisconsin, United States.

Geography
Murphy Corner is located at (44.383333, -88.333333). Its elevation is 811 feet (247m).

Transportation

References

Unincorporated communities in Outagamie County, Wisconsin
Unincorporated communities in Wisconsin